Mike Tisdale (born September 15, 1989) is a former American professional basketball player. He played college basketball at the University of Illinois.

Tisdale grew up in Riverton, Illinois and attended the University of Illinois from 2007–2011. Tisdale finished second in school history with 176 career blocks and No. 25 on Illini all-time scoring list with 1,243 points. He also finished his career tied with Demetri McCamey for the most games played (139) in Illinois history.

Tisdale went undrafted in the June 2011 NBA Draft. Tisdale signed with DJK Würzburg of Germany in August 2011, but his contract was voided before Tisdale appeared in any games for the team as DJK Würzburg claimed Tisdale had a back injury. In December 2011, Tisdale was signed by the Philadelphia 76ers for their training camp roster, but did not appear in any games for the team during the NBA pre-season and was waived before the start of the regular season. In 2011, Tisdale played for the Red Claws but was released after 8 games. In 2012, he signed with the Mad Ants but left after 12 games.

References

External links
Illinois Fighting Illini bio
Real GM profile

1989 births
Living people
American expatriate basketball people in Germany
Basketball players from Illinois
Centers (basketball)
Fort Wayne Mad Ants players
Illinois Fighting Illini men's basketball players
Maine Red Claws players
People from Riverton, Illinois
American men's basketball players